Bosnia and Herzegovina participated in the Eurovision Song Contest 2006 with the song "Lejla" written by Željko Joksimović, Fahrudin Pecikoza and Dejan Ivanović. The song was performed by the band Hari Mata Hari. Songwriter Željko Joksimović represented Serbia and Montenegro in the Eurovision Song Contest 2004 with the song "Lane moje" where he placed second in the grand final of the competition. On 9 February 2006, the Bosnian broadcaster Radio and Television of Bosnia and Herzegovina (BHRT) revealed that they had internally selected Hari Mata Hari to compete at the 2006 contest in Athens, Greece. Their song, "Lejla", was presented to the public during a show entitled BH Eurosong 2006 on 5 March 2006.

Bosnia and Herzegovina competed in the semi-final of the Eurovision Song Contest which took place on 18 May 2006. Performing during the show in position 22, "Lejla" was announced among the top 10 entries of the semi-final and therefore qualified to compete in the final on 20 May. It was later revealed that Bosnia and Herzegovina placed second out of the 23 participating countries in the semi-final with 267 points. In the final, Bosnia and Herzegovina performed in position 13 and placed third out of the 24 participating countries, scoring 229 points.

Background

The nation's best placing in the contest was seventh, which it achieved in 1999 with the song "Putnici" performed by Dino and Béatrice.

The Bosnian national broadcaster, Radio and Television of Bosnia and Herzegovina (BHRT), broadcasts the event within Bosnia and Herzegovina and organises the selection process for the nation's entry. BHRT confirmed their intentions to participate at the 2006 Eurovision Song Contest on 5 January 2006. This marked the first time that both the artist and song that would represent Bosnia and Herzegovina was internally selected; previously the broadcaster had used a national final to choose the artist, song or both to compete at the contest.

Before Eurovision

Internal selection 
The broadcaster directly invited composers to submit songs in one of the official languages of Bosnia and Herzegovina up until 23 January 2006. On 9 February 2006, BHRT announced that they had internally selected the band Hari Mata Hari to represent Bosnia and Herzegovina in Athens. The announcement occurred during a press conference which was held at the UNITIC center of the University of Sarajevo. Hari Mata Hari were due to represent Bosnia and Herzegovina in the Eurovision Song Contest 1999 with the song "Starac i more" before its disqualification as the song was previously released in Finland in 1997. The song to be performed at the contest was also selected internally and was written by Željko Joksimović, Fahrudin Pecikoza and Dejan Ivanović. Joksimović previously represented Serbia and Montenegro in the Eurovision Song Contest 2004, placing second with the song "Lane moje".

The song, under three working titles "Lejla", "Sakrivena" and "Zar bi mogla ti drugog voljeti", was presented during a television special entitled BH Eurosong 2006 on 5 March 2006, which was held at the Sarajevo National Theatre and hosted by Mario Drmac and Dejan Kukrić. The show was broadcast on BHT 1 as well as streamed online via the broadcaster's website pbsbih.ba. In addition to the presentation of the song, the show featured guest performances by Željko Joksimović, 1964 Yugoslav Eurovision entrant Sabahudin Kurt, 1976 Yugoslav Eurovision entrants Ambasadori, 2003 Bosnian Eurovision entrant Mija Martina, 2004 Bosnian Eurovision entrant Deen, and 2005 Bosnian Eurovision entrant Feminnem. Following the show, the public was able to vote for their favourite song title on BHRT's website and "Lejla" was selected with 3,501 votes.

At Eurovision
According to Eurovision rules, all nations with the exceptions of the host country, the "Big Four" (France, Germany, Spain and the United Kingdom) and the ten highest placed finishers in the 2005 contest are required to qualify from the semi-final on 18 May 2006 in order to compete for the final on 20 May 2006; the top ten countries from the semi-final progress to the final.

In the semi-final, the members of Hari Mata Hari were joined on stage by backing vocalists Ksenija Milošević and Ivana Čabraja during the performance and at the end of the show, Bosnia and Herzegovina was announced as having finished in the top 10 and subsequently qualifying for the grand final. It was later revealed that Bosnia and Herzegovina placed second in the semi-final, receiving a total of 267 points. Bosnia and Herzegovina placed third in the final, scoring 229 points.

The semi-final and the final were broadcast in Bosnia and Herzegovina on BHT 1 with commentary by Dejan Kukrić. The Bosnian spokesperson, who announced the Bosnian votes during the final, was Vesna Andree-Zaimović.

Voting 
Below is a breakdown of points awarded to Bosnia and Herzegovina and awarded by Bosnia and Herzegovina in the semi-final and grand final of the contest. The nation awarded its 12 points to Turkey in the semi-final and to Croatia in the final of the contest.

Points awarded to Bosnia and Herzegovina

Points awarded by Bosnia and Herzegovina

References

2006
Countries in the Eurovision Song Contest 2006
Eurovision